Filipowski is a surname. Notable people with this surname include:
Andrew Filipowski (born 1950), American businessman
Grzegorz Filipowski (born 1966), Polish figure skater
Herschell Filipowski (1816–1872), Lithuanian-born British Jewish Hebraist, editor, mathematician, linguist and actuary
Kyle Filipowski (born 2003), American basketball player
Sharon Filipowski (born 1966), American applied mathematician and operations researcher